Dick Turner  (born 1866) was a Welsh international footballer. He was part of the Wales national football team, playing 2 matches. He played his first match on 7 February 1891 against Ireland and his last match on 7 March 1891 against England. At club level, he played for Wrexham.

See also
 List of Wales international footballers (alphabetical)

References

1866 births
Welsh footballers
Wales international footballers
Wrexham A.F.C. players
Place of birth missing
Year of death missing

Association footballers not categorized by position